Men's Greco-Roman 96 kg competition at the 2010 Commonwealth Games in New Delhi, India, was held on 5 October at the Indira Gandhi Arena.

Hassene Fkiri of Australia was ejected from the competition after being disqualified during the gold medal bout for making offensive gestures to and abusing officials in response to being cautioned for headbutting and slapping. Accordingly, South Africa's Kakoma Bella-Lufu received the silver medal and Canada's Eric Feunekes received the bronze.

Medalists

Bracket

Repechage

References

Wrestling at the 2010 Commonwealth Games